NASL Final 1973 was the championship match of the 1973 season, between the expansion Philadelphia Atoms and the Dallas Tornado.  The match was played on August 25, 1973 at Texas Stadium in Irving, Texas.
The Philadelphia Atoms won the match, 2–0, and were crowned the 1973 North American Soccer League champions.

Background
The Dallas Tornado qualified for the playoffs by virtue of winning the Southern Division with 111 points. They also had the highest point-total in the NASL, and therefore were guaranteed home field throughout the playoffs. They defeated the defending champion New York Cosmos, 1–0, in the first semifinal game played on August 15, 1973 to advance to the finals.

The Philadelphia Atoms qualified for the playoffs by virtue of winning the Eastern Division with 104 points. They also had the second highest point-total in the NASL. This guaranteed them at least one home playoff game. They soundly defeated the Northern Division champion Toronto Metros, 3–0, in the second semifinal game played on August 18, 1973 to advance to the finals.

Match details 

 

1973 NASL Champions: Philadelphia Atoms

See also 
 1973 North American Soccer League season

References

External links
 

1973
 
1973
1973
August 1973 sports events in the United States
1973 in sports in Texas
Soccer in Texas